The Wall Street Whiz, also known under the title The New Butler, is a 1925 American silent action film directed by Jack Nelson and starring Richard Talmadge, Marceline Day, and Lillian Langdon.
The film was billed as, "A rip-roaring comedy action drama of Wall Street chuck full of thrilling and interesting situations from beginning to end."

Plot
As described in a review in a film magazine, Richard Butler (Talmadge) is a snappy young society man who under cover operates in the stock market, being in reality the mysterious "Wall Street Whiz." In a café he has an encounter with crooks, the place is raided, and he seeks refuge in an automobile containing Mrs. McCooey (Langdon), a newly rich woman, and her daughter Peggy (Day). When he introduces himself as a Butler, the same job is offered him and he accepts. Eventually he saves the young woman's father (Mason) from being ruined by a financial shark and wins the affections of the young woman, but not until after he has had a strenuous time to keep his true identity secret and a few more encounters with crooks, yeggs, etc.

Cast

References

Bibliography
 Darby, William. Masters of Lens and Light: A Checklist of Major Cinematographers and Their Feature Films. Scarecrow Press, 1991.

External links
 

1925 films
1920s action films
American silent feature films
American action films
Films directed by Jack Nelson
American black-and-white films
Film Booking Offices of America films
1920s English-language films
1920s American films